The 1977 Critérium du Dauphiné Libéré was the 29th edition of the cycle race and was held from 30 May to 6 June 1977. The race started in Avignon and finished at Thonon-les-Bains. The race was won by Bernard Hinault of the Gitane–Campagnolo team. An all time highlight from this race was on the stage to Grenoble when Hinault miscalculated a high speed turn and went into a ravine. He left his totaled bike at the bottom, climbed back up, got on a new bike and went on to win the stage and the race by nine seconds over Bernard Thévenet. This race included five eventual Tour de France winners, all of whom finished in the top 10 including previous winners Merckx, Van Impe and Thevenet as well as future winners Hinault and Zoetemelk.

Teams
Nine teams, containing a total of 89 riders, participated in the race:

 
 
 
 
 Lejeune–BP

Route

General classification

References

1977
1977 in French sport
1977 Super Prestige Pernod
May 1977 sports events in Europe
June 1977 sports events in Europe